WPOI (101.5 FM) - branded as Hot 101.5 - is an FM radio station in Tampa, Florida but is licensed to St. Petersburg. Owned by Cox Radio, the station airs a Top 40/CHR format. The studios are located in St. Petersburg, and the transmitter site is in Riverview. With a good radio, it can be heard in Orlando.

WPOI is one of the two Top 40 radio stations in Tampa, the other being iHeartMedia's WFLZ (93.3 FM).

History

Religious (1961-1997) 
The station started out in 1961 as WGNB. In 1974, it became WKES, which was a religious station operated by the Moody Bible Institute, from studios at the Moody-affiliated Keswick Christian School in Seminole.

Love Songs (1997-1998) 
In 1997, in a three way swap, Paxson Broadcasting acquired Lakeland Christian station WCIE 91.1 from the Carpenter's Home Church, who in turn swapped the station with Moody's WKES. WKES would soon move to 91.1 FM; after a brief simulcast period, the WKES call sign would move to 91.1, while 101.5 would become WILV, broadcasting a "Love Songs" format branded as "Love 101.5", in July of that year.

Jammin Oldies (1998-2001) 
WILV was a failure, and in 1998, Paxson Communications was bought out by Clear Channel Communications. With that, on September 19, 1998, the format changed to Rhythmic oldies as WFJO, "Jo 101.5". In 1999, Cox Radio purchased WFJO along with several other stations.

80s Hits (2001-2011) 
On December 15, 2001, the station flipped to an all ‘80s format, branded as "The New 101-5 The Point". The first song as "The Point" was "Don't You (Forget About Me)" by Simple Minds. The station was modeled after KHPT in Houston, Texas that had launched the previous year. The call letters became WPOI on January 14, 2002. The original slogan was "The Best of the '80s and More", which included late-1970s and early-1990s tracks, along with 1980s’ songs.

In 2006, "The Point" started adding more 1990s songs to the playlist. In 2009, the station added songs as late as 2000. "The Point" also removed all pre-1980s music from the station.

In September 2010, the station adopted "The Best Music of the '80s and '90s" slogan.

In May 2011, the "New" was finally dropped from the station's name. Around the same time, the "New" was dropped from the name of sister stations WWRM and WXGL.

Top 40 (2011-present) 
On July 1, 2011, at 10 a.m., after playing Jon Bon Jovi's "Blaze of Glory", WPOI began stunting with random song clips. One hour later, the station flipped to CHR as "Hot 101-5". The first song as "Hot" was LMFAO's "Party Rock Anthem" featuring Lauren Bennett and GoonRock. The station has taken direct aim at WFLZ, and targets an 18–49 year old audience (particularly, the 18–34 age bracket) with a music-intensive current-based playlist that borders towards Dance-pop tracks, with less talk and commercials than its competitors.

References

External links

POI
Contemporary hit radio stations in the United States
Cox Media Group
1961 establishments in Florida
Radio stations established in 1961